Albert Jesionek (9 January 1870 in Lindau – 8 December 1935 in Giessen) was a German dermatologist.

He studied medicine at the universities of Kiel, Tübingen and Munich, where in 1894 he received his doctorate. After graduation, he spent several years working as an assistant at the municipal hospital in Munich, and from 1900 served as a deputy senior physician at the dermatology clinic in Munich under Karl Posselt (1837–1916). In 1906 he became an associate professor, and later the same year relocated to the University of Giessen, where in 1913 he was appointed director of the Lupusheilstätte (sanatorium for lupus). In 1918 he was named a full professor of dermatology at the university.

He is remembered for his work involving light-therapy for the treatment of skin tuberculosis. He recognized the importance of early studies done by Joseph Doutrelepont and Niels Ryberg Finsen in regards to light-therapy treatment for lupus and skin tuberculosis; and with Hermann von Tappeiner and Albert Jodlbauer at Munich, he had taken part in research of light from a biological standpoint. In 1910 he published a monograph on the latter subject titled "Lichtbiologie", followed by "Lichtbiologie und Lichtpathologie" two years later.

From 1920 onward, he was involved with issues such as the pathogenesis of skin tuberculosis, the curative effect of tuberculins and the treatment of skin tuberculosis from a dietary standpoint, namely the "Sauerbruch-Herrmannsdorfer-Gerson diet".

A specialized irradiation lamp known as a "Jesionek lamp" is named after him.

Selected works 
 Lichtbiologie : Die experimentellen Grundlagen der modernen Lichthandlung, 1910.
 Praktische Ergebnisse auf dem Gebiete der Haut- und Geschlechtskrankheiten (3 parts, 1910–14).
 Lichtbiologie und Lichtpathologie, 1912.
 Biologie der gesunden und kranken Haut, 1916.
 "Light as stimulus and its therapeutic indications" (published in English, 1926)
 Tuberkulose und Haut; eine biologische Studie, 1929
 Diätetische Behandlung der Hauttuberkulose und Ernährungsbiologie (with Lutz Bernhardt), 1930.

References 

1870 births
1935 deaths
People from Lindau
Academic staff of the University of Giessen
Academic staff of the Ludwig Maximilian University of Munich
German dermatologists